The Brin-class submarine was a group of five long-range submarines built for the Royal Italian Navy (Regia Marina) during the 1930s.

Design and description
The Brin-class submarines were improved versions of the preceding . 
Two boats were replacements for submarines of that class that were secretly transferred to the Nationalists during the Spanish Civil War in 1937. They displaced  surfaced and  submerged. The class was partially double hulled.

For surface running, the boats were powered by two  diesel engines, each driving one propeller shaft. When submerged each propeller was driven by a  electric motor. They could reach  on the surface and  underwater.

The boats were armed with eight internal  torpedo tubes, four each in the bow and stern. They carried a total of 14 torpedoes. They were also armed with one  deck gun for combat on the surface. The gun was initially mounted in the rear of the conning tower, but this was re-sited on the forward deck later in the war in the surviving boats and the large conning tower was re-built to a smaller design.  The light anti-aircraft armament consisted of one or two pairs of   machine guns.

Ships

Notes

References

External links
 Brin-class submarine Marina Militare website

Submarine classes
 
 Brin